Gentelles is a commune in the Somme department in Hauts-de-France in northern France. It is part of the arrondissement of Amiens and the canton of Amiens-4.

Geography

History
The village has been known by various name through its history: Gentilla, Gentella, Gentèle, Gentela, Gentelles, Gentilles, Le Gendalle and finally Gentelles.

It was the first town to be given to the abbey of Corbie by Clovis II and Saint Bathilde.

On November 27, 1870, during the Franco-Prussian War, Gentelles was the scene of a skirmish between the 20th Battalion of Chasseurs and the Germans.  There were 25 fatalities, of which 12 were French, who are buried in the cemetery, where later a memorial was erected.

During World War I, the village was at the centre of fighting during the Battle of the Somme and was all but destroyed.

Population

See also
Communes of the Somme department

References

Communes of Somme (department)